Palang Darreh is a village in Ruin Rural District, in the Central District of Esfarayen County, North Khorasan Province, Iran. At the 2006 census, its population was 69, in 19 families.

References 

Populated places in Esfarayen County